Barra do Ouro is a municipality located in the Brazilian state of Tocantins. Its population is estimated at 4,632 (2020) and its area is 1,106 km².

References

Municipalities in Tocantins